Carberry Island is a small uninhabited island in Lough Ree in County Westmeath, Ireland. Located near Athlone, the island was previously used by Athlone Yacht Club.

References 

Islands of County Westmeath